Haliclona is a genus of demosponges in the family Chalinidae.

Species

The following species are recognised in the genus Haliclona:

Subgenus Haliclona (Flagellia) Van Soest, 2017
 Haliclona (Flagellia) amirantensis Van Soest, 2017
 Haliclona (Flagellia) anataria (Lévi & Lévi, 1983)
 Haliclona (Flagellia) edaphus De Laubenfels, 1930
 Haliclona (Flagellia) flagellifera (Ridley & Dendy, 1886)
 Haliclona (Flagellia) hajdui Van Soest, 2017
 Haliclona (Flagellia) hamata (Thiele, 1903)
 Haliclona (Flagellia) hentscheli Van Soest, 2017
 Haliclona (Flagellia) hiberniae Van Soest, 2017
 Haliclona (Flagellia) indonesiae Van Soest, 2017
 Haliclona (Flagellia) porosa (Fristedt, 1887)
 Haliclona (Flagellia) xenomorpha Dinn, 2020
Subgenus Haliclona (Gellius) Gray, 1867
 Haliclona (Gellius) amboinensis (Lévi, 1961)
 Haliclona (Gellius) anatarius (Lévi & Lévi, 1983)
 Haliclona (Gellius) angulata (Bowerbank, 1866)
 Haliclona (Gellius) arnesenae (Arndt, 1927)
 Haliclona (Gellius) binaria (Topsent, 1927)
 Haliclona (Gellius) bioxeata (Boury-Esnault, Pansini & Uriz, 1994)
 Haliclona (Gellius) borzatii (Sarà, 1978)
 Haliclona (Gellius) bubastes (Row, 1911)
 Haliclona (Gellius) calcinea (Burton, 1954)
 Haliclona (Gellius) carduus (Ridley & Dendy, 1886)
 Haliclona (Gellius) cellaria (Rao, 1941)
 Haliclona (Gellius) ceratina (Ridley, 1884)
 Haliclona (Gellius) claudelevii Van Soest & Hooper, 2020
 Haliclona (Gellius) constans (Boury-Esnault & van Beveren, 1982)
 Haliclona (Gellius) coreana Kim & Sim, 2004
 Haliclona (Gellius) cucurbitiformis (Kirkpatrick, 1907)
 Haliclona (Gellius) cymaeformis (Esper, 1806)
 Haliclona (Gellius) depellens (Topsent, 1908)
 Haliclona (Gellius) dubia (Babic, 1922)
 Haliclona (Gellius) emilei Van Soest & Hooper, 2020
 Haliclona (Gellius) emiletopsenti Van Soest & Hooper, 2020
 Haliclona (Gellius) fibulata (Schmidt, 1862)
 Haliclona (Gellius) flabelliformis (Ridley & Dendy, 1886)
 Haliclona (Gellius) forcipata (Thiele, 1903)
 Haliclona (Gellius) friabilis (Lévi, 1956)
 Haliclona (Gellius) glaberrima (Topsent, 1897)
 Haliclona (Gellius) glacialis (Ridley & Dendy, 1886)
 Haliclona (Gellius) hispidula (Topsent, 1897)
 Haliclona (Gellius) holgerbrondstedi Van Soest & Hooper, 2020
 Haliclona (Gellius) intermedia (Brøndsted, 1924)
 Haliclona (Gellius) jeancharcoti Van Soest & Hooper, 2020
 Haliclona (Gellius) jorii (Uriz, 1984)
 Haliclona (Gellius) kieschnicki Van Soest & Hooper, 2020
 Haliclona (Gellius) lacazei (Topsent, 1893)
 Haliclona (Gellius) laevis (Ridley & Dendy, 1886)
 Haliclona (Gellius) latisigmae (Boury-Esnault & van Beveren, 1982)
 Haliclona (Gellius) laubenfelsi Van Soest & Hooper, 2020
 Haliclona (Gellius) laurentina (Lambe, 1900)
 Haliclona (Gellius) laxa (Topsent, 1892)
 Haliclona (Gellius) marismedi (Pulitzer-Finali, 1978)
 Haliclona (Gellius) megasclera Lehnert & van Soest, 1996
 Haliclona (Gellius) megastoma Burton, 1928
 Haliclona (Gellius) microsigma (Babic, 1922)
 Haliclona (Gellius) microtoxa (Lundbeck, 1902)
 Haliclona (Gellius) microxea (Li, 1986)
 Haliclona (Gellius) microxifera (Topsent, 1925)
 Haliclona (Gellius) panis (Lendenfeld, 1888)
 Haliclona (Gellius) patbergquistae Van Soest & Hooper, 2020
 Haliclona (Gellius) perforata (Wilson, 1904)
 Haliclona (Gellius) petrocalyx (Dendy, 1924)
 Haliclona (Gellius) phillipensis (Dendy, 1895)
 Haliclona (Gellius) primitiva (Lundbeck, 1902)
 Haliclona (Gellius) proxima (Lundbeck, 1902)
 Haliclona (Gellius) pulitzeri Van Soest & Hooper, 2020
 Haliclona (Gellius) raphidiophora (Lendenfeld, 1888)
 Haliclona (Gellius) rava (Stephens, 1912)
 Haliclona (Gellius) regia (Brøndsted, 1924)
 Haliclona (Gellius) reptans (Whitelegge, 1906)
 Haliclona (Gellius) rhaphidiophora (Brøndsted, 1933)
 Haliclona (Gellius) ridleyi (Hentschel, 1912)
 Haliclona (Gellius) rudis (Topsent, 1901)
 Haliclona (Gellius) spongiosa Topsent, 1904
 Haliclona (Gellius) strongylata (Lindgren, 1897)
 Haliclona (Gellius) tenerrima Burton, 1954
 Haliclona (Gellius) tenuisigma (Sarà & Siribelli, 1960)
 Haliclona (Gellius) textapatina (Laubenfels, 1926)
 Haliclona (Gellius) toxia (Topsent, 1897)
 Haliclona (Gellius) toxophora (Hentschel, 1912)
 Haliclona (Gellius) toxotes (Hentschel, 1912)
 Haliclona (Gellius) tremulus (Topsent, 1916)
 Haliclona (Gellius) tricurvatifera (Carter, 1876)
 Haliclona (Gellius) tubuloramosa (Dendy, 1924)
 Haliclona (Gellius) tylotoxa (Hentschel, 1914)
 Haliclona (Gellius) uncinata (Topsent, 1892)
 Haliclona (Gellius) varia (Bowerbank, 1875)
 Haliclona (Gellius) vasiformis (Wilson, 1925)
 Haliclona (Gellius) vladimirkoltuni Van Soest & Hooper, 2020
Subgenus Haliclona (Halichoclona) de Laubenfels, 1932
 Haliclona (Halichoclona) albifragilis (Hechtel, 1965)
 Haliclona (Halichoclona) caminata (Bergquist & Warne, 1980)
 Haliclona (Halichoclona) centrangulata (Sollas, 1902)
 Haliclona (Halichoclona) cioniformis (Lévi, 1956)
 Haliclona (Halichoclona) conica (Thiele, 1905)
 Haliclona (Halichoclona) depressa (Topsent, 1893)
 Haliclona (Halichoclona) dura Sandes, Bispo & Pinheiro, 2014
 Haliclona (Halichoclona) fistulosa (Bowerbank, 1866)
 Haliclona (Halichoclona) fortior (Schmidt, 1870)
 Haliclona (Halichoclona) fulva (Topsent, 1893)
 Haliclona (Halichoclona) gellindra (de Laubenfels, 1932)
 Haliclona (Halichoclona) latens (Topsent, 1892)
 Haliclona (Halichoclona) lernerae Campos, Mothes, Eckert & van Soest, 2005
 Haliclona (Halichoclona) magna (Vacelet, 1969)
 Haliclona (Halichoclona) magnifica de Weerdt, Rützler & Smith, 1991
 Haliclona (Halichoclona) mokuoloea (de Laubenfels, 1950)
 Haliclona (Halichoclona) parietalis (Topsent, 1893)
 Haliclona (Halichoclona) perlucida (Griessinger, 1971)
 Haliclona (Halichoclona) plakophila Vicente, Zea & Hill, 2016
 Haliclona (Halichoclona) pulitzerfinalii Van Soest & Hooper, 2020
 Haliclona (Halichoclona) sonnae Kelly & Rowden, 2019
 Haliclona (Halichoclona) stoneae de Weerdt, 2000
 Haliclona (Halichoclona) vanderlandi de Weerdt & van Soest, 2001
 Haliclona (Halichoclona) vansoesti de Weerdt, de Kluijver & Gómez, 1999
Subgenus Haliclona (Haliclona) Grant, 1836
 Haliclona (Haliclona) ambrosia (Dickinson, 1945)
 Haliclona (Haliclona) anonyma (Stephens, 1915)
 Haliclona (Haliclona) bifacialis Sarà, 1978
 Haliclona (Haliclona) cervicornis (Pallas, 1766)
 Haliclona (Haliclona) cribriformis (Ridley, 1884)
 Haliclona (Haliclona) cylindrica (Topsent, 1913)
 Haliclona (Haliclona) domingoi (Sarà, 1978)
 Haliclona (Haliclona) epiphytica Zea & de Weerdt, 1999
 Haliclona (Haliclona) fibrosa (Carter, 1887)
 Haliclona (Haliclona) gustavopulitzeri Van Soest & Hooper, 2020
 Haliclona (Haliclona) ieoensis Kim, Lee & Kang, 2017
 Haliclona (Haliclona) jeanmicheli Van Soest & Hooper, 2020
 Haliclona (Haliclona) mammillaris Mothes & Lerner, 1994
 Haliclona (Haliclona) massiliensis Van Soest & Hooper, 2020
 Haliclona (Haliclona) michelei Van Soest & Hooper, 2020
 Haliclona (Haliclona) nishimurai Tanita, 1977
 Haliclona (Haliclona) oculata (Linnaeus, 1759)
 Haliclona (Haliclona) onomichiensis Hoshino, 1981
 Haliclona (Haliclona) ramosamassa Hoshino, 1981
 Haliclona (Haliclona) simulans (Johnston, 1842)
 Haliclona (Haliclona) sonorensis Cruz-Barraza & Carballo, 2006
 Haliclona (Haliclona) sortitio Hoshino, 1981
 Haliclona (Haliclona) stilensis Burton, 1933
 Haliclona (Haliclona) sumenyoensis Kim, Lee & Kang, 2017
 Haliclona (Haliclona) tonggumiensis Kang, Lee & Sim, 2013
 Haliclona (Haliclona) uljinensis Kang & Sim, 2007
 Haliclona (Haliclona) urceolus (Rathke & Vahl, 1806)
 Haliclona (Haliclona) urizae Samaai & Gibbons, 2005
 Haliclona (Haliclona) varia (Sarà, 1958)
 Haliclona (Haliclona) venata (Sarà, 1960)
 Haliclona (Haliclona) violacea (Keller, 1883)
 Haliclona (Haliclona) violopurpura Hoshino, 1981
Subgenus Haliclona (Reniera) Schmidt, 1862
 Haliclona (Reniera) abbreviata (Topsent, 1918)
 Haliclona (Reniera) altera (Topsent, 1901)
 Haliclona (Reniera) alusiana (Lévi, 1969)
 Haliclona (Reniera) aquaeductus (Schmidt, 1862)
 Haliclona (Reniera) atra (Pulitzer-Finali, 1993)
 Haliclona (Reniera) caduca Hajdu, Desqueyroux-Faúndez, Carvalho, Lôbo-Hajdu & Willenz, 2013
 Haliclona (Reniera) chlorilla Bispo, Correia & Hajdu, 2016
 Haliclona (Reniera) cinerea (Grant, 1826)
 Haliclona (Reniera) ciocalyptoides Burton, 1933
 Haliclona (Reniera) citrina (Topsent, 1892)
 Haliclona (Reniera) clathrata (Dendy, 1895)
 Haliclona (Reniera) coerulescens (Topsent, 1918)
 Haliclona (Reniera) cratera (Schmidt, 1862)
 Haliclona (Reniera) cribricutis (Dendy, 1922)
 Haliclona (Reniera) debilis Pulitzer-Finali, 1993
 Haliclona (Reniera) delicata (Sarà, 1978)
 Haliclona (Reniera) fascigera (Hentschel, 1912)
 Haliclona (Reniera) griessingeri van Lent & De Weerdt, 1987
 Haliclona (Reniera) hongdoensis Kang & Sim, 2007
 Haliclona (Reniera) implexiformis (Hechtel, 1965)
 Haliclona (Reniera) infundibularis (Ridley & Dendy, 1887)
 Haliclona (Reniera) ligniformis (Dendy, 1922)
 Haliclona (Reniera) manglaris Alcolado, 1984
 Haliclona (Reniera) mediterranea Griessinger, 1971
 Haliclona (Reniera) mucifibrosa de Weerdt, Rützler & Smith, 1991
 Haliclona (Reniera) neens (Topsent, 1918)
 Haliclona (Reniera) negro (Tanita, 1965)
 Haliclona (Reniera) osiris (de Laubenfels, 1954)
 Haliclona (Reniera) phlox (de Laubenfels, 1954)
 Haliclona (Reniera) portroyalensis Jackson, de Weerdt & Webber, 2006
 Haliclona (Reniera) rotographura (Laubenfels, 1954)
 Haliclona (Reniera) ruetzleri de Weerdt, 2000
 Haliclona (Reniera) sinyeoensis Kang, Lee & Sim, 2013
 Haliclona (Reniera) strongylophora Lehnert & van Soest, 1996
 Haliclona (Reniera) subtilis Griessinger, 1971
 Haliclona (Reniera) tabernacula (Row, 1911)
 Haliclona (Reniera) topsenti (Thiele, 1905)
 Haliclona (Reniera) tubifera (George & Wilson, 1919)
 Haliclona (Reniera) tufoides (Dendy, 1922)
 Haliclona (Reniera) tyroeis (Laubenfels, 1954)
 Haliclona (Reniera) venusta (Bowerbank, 1875)
Subgenus Haliclona (Rhizoniera) Griessinger, 1971
 Haliclona (Rhizoniera) anceps (Thiele, 1905)
 Haliclona (Rhizoniera) australis (Lendenfeld, 1888)
 Haliclona (Rhizoniera) bouryesnaultae Van Soest & Hooper, 2020
 Haliclona (Rhizoniera) brondstedi Bergquist & Warne, 1980
 Haliclona (Rhizoniera) canaliculata Hartman, 1958
 Haliclona (Rhizoniera) curacaoensis (van Soest, 1980)
 Haliclona (Rhizoniera) dancoi (Topsent, 1901)
 Haliclona (Rhizoniera) enamela Laubenfels, 1930
 Haliclona (Rhizoniera) fugidia Muricy, Esteves, Monteiro, Rodrigues & Albano, 2015
 Haliclona (Rhizoniera) grossa (Schmidt, 1864)
 Haliclona (Rhizoniera) indistincta (Bowerbank, 1866)
 Haliclona (Rhizoniera) rhizophora (Vacelet, 1969)
 Haliclona (Rhizoniera) rosea (Bowerbank, 1866)
 Haliclona (Rhizoniera) rufescens (Lambe, 1893)
 Haliclona (Rhizoniera) sarai (Pulitzer-Finali, 1969)
 Haliclona (Rhizoniera) strongylata (Lévi & Lévi, 1983)
 Haliclona (Rhizoniera) tromsoica (Hentschel, 1929)
 Haliclona (Rhizoniera) viscosa (Topsent, 1888)
Subgenus Haliclona (Soestella) De Weerdt, 2000
 Haliclona (Soestella) arenata (Griessinger, 1971)
 Haliclona (Soestella) auletta (Thiele, 1905)
 Haliclona (Soestella) battershilli Kelly & Rowden, 2019
 Haliclona (Soestella) brassica Sandes, Bispo & Pinheiro, 2014
 Haliclona (Soestella) caerulea (Hechtel, 1965)
 Haliclona (Soestella) chilensis (Thiele, 1905)
 Haliclona (Soestella) crowtheri Goodwin, Brewin & Brickle, 2012
 Haliclona (Soestella) elegantia (Bowerbank, 1875)
 Haliclona (Soestella) fimbriata Bertolino & Pansini, 2015
 Haliclona (Soestella) implexa (Schmidt, 1868)
 Haliclona (Soestella) lehnerti de Weerdt, 2000
 Haliclona (Soestella) luciensis de Weerdt, 2000
 Haliclona (Soestella) mamillata (Griessinger, 1971)
 Haliclona (Soestella) melana Muricy & Ribeiro, 1999
 Haliclona (Soestella) mucosa (Griessinger, 1971)
 Haliclona (Soestella) peixinhoae Bispo, Correia & Hajdu, 2016
 Haliclona (Soestella) piscaderaensis (van Soest, 1980)
 Haliclona (Soestella) smithae de Weerdt, 2000
 Haliclona (Soestella) twincayensis de Weerdt, Rützler & Smith, 1991
 Haliclona (Soestella) valliculata (Griessinger, 1971)
 Haliclona (Soestella) vermeuleni de Weerdt, 2000
 Haliclona (Soestella) walentinae Díaz, Thacker, Rützler & Piantoni, 2007
 Haliclona (Soestella) xena De Weerdt, 1986
Subgenus unassigned
 Haliclona acoroides Kelly-Borges & Bergquist, 1988
 Haliclona agglutinata Desqueyroux-Faúndez, 1990
 Haliclona alba (Schmidt, 1862)
 Haliclona algicola (Thiele, 1905)
 Haliclona amphioxa (de Laubenfels, 1950)
 Haliclona aperta (Sarà, 1960)
 Haliclona arctica (Fristedt, 1887)
 Haliclona arenosa (Carter, 1882)
 Haliclona baeri (Wilson, 1925)
 Haliclona bawiana (Lendenfeld, 1897)
 Haliclona bergquistae Van Soest & Hooper, 2020
 Haliclona bilamellata Burton, 1932
 Haliclona boutschinskii (Kudelin, 1910)
 Haliclona bucina Tanita & Hoshino, 1989
 Haliclona bulbifera (Swartschewsky, 1906)
 Haliclona calamus (Lundbeck, 1902)
 Haliclona cancellata (Carter, 1887)
 Haliclona carteri Burton, 1959
 Haliclona catarinensis Mothes & Lerner, 1994
 Haliclona cavernosa (Pulitzer-Finali, 1993)
 Haliclona cerebrum (Burton, 1928)
 Haliclona clara Cuartas, 1992
 Haliclona cnidata Schellenberg, Reichert, Hardt, Schmidtberg, Kämpfer, Glasser, Schubert & Wilke, 2019
 Haliclona columbae (Walker, 1808)
 Haliclona corticata (Lendenfeld, 1887)
 Haliclona cribrata (Pulitzer-Finali, 1983)
 Haliclona cribrosa (Czerniavsky, 1880)
 Haliclona curiosa (Swartschewsky, 1905)
 Haliclona cylindrigera (Czerniavsky, 1880)
 Haliclona daepoensis (Sim & Lee, 1997)
 Haliclona decidua (Topsent, 1906)
 Haliclona delicatula (Ali, 1956)
 Haliclona dendrilla (Lendenfeld, 1887)
 Haliclona densa (Lendenfeld, 1887)
 Haliclona densaspicula Hoshino, 1981
 Haliclona digitata (Lendenfeld, 1887)
 Haliclona divulgata Koltun, 1964
 Haliclona djeedara Fromont & Abdo, 2014
 Haliclona durdong Fromont & Abdo, 2014
 Haliclona elegans (Lendenfeld, 1887)
 Haliclona ellipsis Hoshino, 1981
 Haliclona enormismacula Hoshino, 1981
 Haliclona ernsthentscheli Van Soest & Hooper, 2020
 Haliclona ernsti Van Soest & Hooper, 2020
 Haliclona eterospiculata (Sarà, 1978)
 Haliclona fibulifera (Carter, 1880)
 Haliclona filholi (Topsent, 1890)
 Haliclona firma (Swartschewsky, 1906)
 Haliclona flabellodigitata Burton, 1934
 Haliclona flaccida (Topsent, 1908)
 Haliclona flava (Nardo, 1847)
 Haliclona flavescens (Topsent, 1893)
 Haliclona foliacea (Miklucho-Maclay, 1870)
 Haliclona folium (Schmidt, 1870)
 Haliclona foraminosa (Czerniavsky, 1880)
 Haliclona forcellata (Nardo, 1847)
 Haliclona fragilis (Vacelet, Vasseur & Lévi, 1976)
 Haliclona frondosa Hoshino, 1981
 Haliclona fryetti (Dendy, 1895)
 Haliclona gemina Sarà, 1978
 Haliclona glabra Bergquist, 1961
 Haliclona globosa (Lendenfeld, 1887)
 Haliclona gracilis (Miklucho-Maclay, 1870)
 Haliclona groenlandica (Fristedt, 1887)
 Haliclona hebes (Schmidt, 1870)
 Haliclona henrycarteri Van Soest & Hooper, 2020
 Haliclona hirsuta (Swartschewsky, 1906)
 Haliclona hornelli (Dendy, 1916)
 Haliclona hoshinoi Ise, 2017
 Haliclona hoshinoi Van Soest & Hooper, 2020
 Haliclona hydroida Tanita & Hoshino, 1989
 Haliclona ignobilis (Thiele, 1905)
 Haliclona inepta (Thiele, 1905)
 Haliclona inflata (Schmidt, 1868)
 Haliclona informis (Schmidt, 1868)
 Haliclona infundibuliformis (Miklucho-Maclay, 1870)
 Haliclona innominata (Kirkpatrick, 1900)
 Haliclona irregularis (Czerniavsky, 1880)
 Haliclona isodictyalis Bergquist, 1961
 Haliclona kaikoura Bergquist & Warne, 1980
 Haliclona kirkpatricki Van Soest & Hooper, 2020
 Haliclona korema de Laubenfels, 1954
 Haliclona koremella de Laubenfels, 1954
 Haliclona labyrinthica sensu Burton, 1956
 Haliclona lendenfeldi Van Soest & Hooper, 2020
 Haliclona lentus Hoshino, 1981
 Haliclona leopoldbaeri Van Soest & Hooper, 2020
 Haliclona leopoldi Van Soest & Hooper, 2020
 Haliclona levii Van Soest & Hooper, 2020
 Haliclona liber (Hoshino, 1981)
 Haliclona lilaceus Mothes & Lerner, 1994
 Haliclona lobosa (Lendenfeld, 1888)
 Haliclona lutea (Lendenfeld, 1887)
 Haliclona macropora (Thiele, 1905)
 Haliclona macrorhaphis (Lendenfeld, 1887)
 Haliclona madagascarensis Vacelet, Vasseur & Lévi, 1976
 Haliclona madrepora (Dendy, 1889)
 Haliclona maxima Bergquist & Warne, 1980
 Haliclona merejkowskii (Swartschewsky, 1906)
 Haliclona minima (Lendenfeld, 1887)
 Haliclona mollicula (Lundbeck, 1902)
 Haliclona mollis (Lambe, 1893)
 Haliclona mollis (Schmidt, 1870)
 Haliclona muricata (Ridley, 1884)
 Haliclona nigra (Burton, 1929)
 Haliclona nigricans (Czerniavsky, 1880)
 Haliclona nitens Desqueyroux-Faúndez, 1990
 Haliclona nodosa (Thiele, 1905)
 Haliclona odessana (Kudelin, 1910)
 Haliclona offerospicula Hoshino, 1981
 Haliclona olivacea Fromont, 1995
 Haliclona omissa (Griessinger, 1971)
 Haliclona pacifica Hooper in Hooper & Wiedenmayer, 1994
 Haliclona palmata (sensu Lieberkühn, 1859)
 Haliclona palmonensis Carballo & Garcia-Gómez, 1995
 Haliclona papillifera (Swartschewsky, 1906)
 Haliclona parietalioides (Bergquist, 1961)
 Haliclona pedicelata (Cuartas, 1986)
 Haliclona pedunculata (Ridley & Dendy, 1886)
 Haliclona penicillata (Topsent, 1908)
 Haliclona permollisimilis Hoshino, 1981
 Haliclona petrosioides Burton, 1932
 Haliclona pigmentifera (Dendy, 1905)
 Haliclona pocilliformis (Griessinger, 1971)
 Haliclona poecillastroides (Vacelet, 1969)
 Haliclona polychotoma (Carter, 1885)
 Haliclona polypoides (Vacelet, Vasseur & Lévi, 1976)
 Haliclona pons (Schmidt, 1870)
 Haliclona pontica (Czerniavsky, 1880)
 Haliclona proletaria (Topsent, 1908)
 Haliclona pulcherrima (Brøndsted, 1924)
 Haliclona pulchra (Swartschewsky, 1906)
 Haliclona pulvinar (Topsent, 1897)
 Haliclona punctata Bergquist & Warne, 1980
 Haliclona ramosa (Lendenfeld, 1887)
 Haliclona ramusculoides (Topsent, 1893)
 Haliclona rapanui (Desqueyroux-Faúndez, 1990)
 Haliclona rectangularis (Ridley & Dendy, 1886)
 Haliclona reticulata (Lendenfeld, 1887)
 Haliclona reversa (Kirk, 1911)
 Haliclona robustaspicula Hoshino, 1981
 Haliclona rossica (Hentschel, 1929)
 Haliclona rowi Van Soest & Hooper, 2020
 Haliclona rubra (Lendenfeld, 1887)
 Haliclona rugosa (Thiele, 1905)
 Haliclona sabulosa Bergquist & Warne, 1980
 Haliclona saldanhae (Stephens, 1915)
 Haliclona sanguinea Fromont, 1995
 Haliclona sasajimensis Hoshino, 1981
 Haliclona sataensis Hoshino, 1981
 Haliclona scabritia Tanita & Hoshino, 1989
 Haliclona schmidtii (Czerniavsky, 1880)
 Haliclona scotti (Kirkpatrick, 1907)
 Haliclona scyphonoides (sensu Ridley, 1884)
 Haliclona semifibrosa (Dendy, 1916)
 Haliclona shimoebuensis (Hoshino, 1981)
 Haliclona similis (Topsent, 1897)
 Haliclona simplex (Czerniavsky, 1880)
 Haliclona simplicissima (Burton, 1933)
 Haliclona siphonella (Thiele, 1905)
 Haliclona solowetzkaja (Hentschel, 1929)
 Haliclona sordida (Thiele, 1905)
 Haliclona sorongae (Brøndsted, 1934)
 Haliclona spiculotenuis (Topsent, 1891)
 Haliclona spinosella (Thiele, 1905)
 Haliclona spitzbergensis (Hentschel, 1916)
 Haliclona spongiosissima (Topsent, 1908)
 Haliclona stelliderma Bergquist & Warne, 1980
 Haliclona stephensi Burton, 1932
 Haliclona steueri Burton, 1936
 Haliclona stirpescens (Topsent, 1925)
 Haliclona streble de Laubenfels, 1954
 Haliclona striata Vacelet, Vasseur & Lévi, 1976
 Haliclona subglobosa (Ridley & Dendy, 1886)
 Haliclona submonilifera Uriz, 1988
 Haliclona surrufa Hoshino, 1981
 Haliclona swartschewskiji (Hentschel, 1929)
 Haliclona tachibanaensis Hoshino, 1981
 Haliclona takaharui Van Soest & Hooper, 2020
 Haliclona tanitai Van Soest & Hooper, 2020
 Haliclona teligera (Topsent, 1889)
 Haliclona tenacior Bergquist, 1961
 Haliclona tenella (Lendenfeld, 1887)
 Haliclona tenera (Marenzeller, 1878)
 Haliclona tenuiderma (Lundbeck, 1902)
 Haliclona tenuiramosa (Burton, 1930)
 Haliclona tenuis Hoshino, 1981
 Haliclona tenuispiculata Burton, 1934
 Haliclona texta Sarà, 1978
 Haliclona thielei Van Soest & Hooper, 2020
 Haliclona transitans (Czerniavsky, 1880)
 Haliclona translucida Desqueyroux-Faúndez, 1990
 Haliclona tubulifera (Swartschewsky, 1905)
 Haliclona tubulosa (Miklucho-Maclay, 1870)
 Haliclona tulearensis Vacelet, Vasseur & Lévi, 1976
 Haliclona turquoisia (de Laubenfels, 1954)
 Haliclona tyria Fromont, 1995
 Haliclona ulreungia Sim & Byeon, 1989
 Haliclona utriculus (Topsent, 1904)
 Haliclona uwaensis (Hoshino, 1981)
 Haliclona varia sensu Lundbeck, 1909
 Haliclona vega (Fristedt, 1887)
 Haliclona venustina (Bergquist, 1961)
 Haliclona verrucosa (Thiele, 1905)
 Haliclona villosa (Lendenfeld, 1887)
 Haliclona viola (de Laubenfels, 1954)
 Haliclona virens (Topsent, 1908)
 Haliclona virgata (Bowerbank, 1875)
 Haliclona voeringi (Lundbeck, 1902)
 Haliclona willundbecki Van Soest & Hooper, 2020

References

External links

 
Chalinidae
Sponge genera